Sony Building may refer to:
Sony Building (New York)
Sony Building (Tokyo)